South Dakota Highway 314 (SD 314) is a  state highway in southwestern Yankton County, South Dakota, United States, that runs from South Dakota Highway 50 (SD 50) to the western city limits of Yankton.

Route description
SD 314 is maintained by SDDOT. In 2012, the traffic on the route was measured in average annual daily traffic. SD 314 had an average of 1325 vehicles. From its western terminus SR 314 heads southeast through flat farmland to cross Deer Boulevard. After continuing southeast for total of  SD 314 reaches its eastern terminus at an intersection with West 11th Street at the western city limits of Yankton.

Major intersections

See also

 List of state highways in South Dakota

References

External links

 The Unofficial South Dakota Highways Page

314
Transportation in Yankton County, South Dakota